Balance is the first studio album by Boston rapper Akrobatik. It was released on May 20, 2003 by Coup D'État. It ranked at number 4 on CMJ's "Hip-Hop 2003" chart.

Critical reception

Julianne Escobedo Shepherd of Pitchfork gave the album a 7.2 out of 10, saying, "The Edan and Fakts One cuts work best with Akrobatik's style, complimenting his relatively straightforward delivery with complex, isolated drumming which sometimes unravels simple breakbeats only to embellish them with surprising, firework-clatter drum fills, confident bass buzz, and quirky funk." Dave Heaton of PopMatters gave the album 8 stars out of 10, describing it as "the work of an artist who not only has important things to say but a talent at articulating those thoughts through his music." Christopher R. Weingarten of CMJ New Music Report wrote, "Within the span of 15 tracks, he tackles misogyny, yearns to follow the proud heritage of the civil rights movement, peacefully breaks up some on-stage static, bemoans environmental destruction and still finds the time to verbally smack suckers."

Track listing

Personnel
Credits adapted from liner notes.

 Akrobatik – vocals, production (9)
 T. the Beat Specialist – production (1)
 DJ Fakts One – production (2, 3), turntables (9)
 Edan – production (4)
 Illmind – production (5)
 DJ Sense – production (6)
 Diamond D – vocals (7), production (7)
 DJ Therapy – production (8, 10, 13), turntables (8, 10)
 Mr. Lif – vocals (9)
 DJ Revolution – production (11), turntables (11)
 Da Beatminerz – production (12)
 DJ Evil Dee – turntables (12)
 The Accomplice – production (14)
 D-Tension – production (15)
 Mark Donahue – mastering
 Sam Wilson – art direction
 Tim Linberg – additional design
 Maya Hayuk – photography

References

External links
 

2003 albums
Akrobatik albums
Albums produced by Da Beatminerz
Albums produced by Diamond D
Albums produced by Illmind